The Feather River California Temple is a temple of the Church of Jesus Christ of Latter-day Saints under construction in Yuba City, California.

History 
The intent to construct the temple was announced by church president Russell M. Nelson on October 7, 2018. The Feather River California Temple was announced concurrently with 11 other temples. At the time, the number of operating or announced temples was 201.

On July 18, 2020, a groundbreaking to signify beginning of construction was held, with Paul H. Watkins, an area seventy, presiding. Plans call for a two-story, single-spired, 38,000 square foot temple. The temple is being built on a nine acre site that formerly had a church meetinghouse.

See also 

 The Church of Jesus Christ of Latter-day Saints in California
 Comparison of temples of The Church of Jesus Christ of Latter-day Saints
 List of temples of The Church of Jesus Christ of Latter-day Saints
 List of temples of The Church of Jesus Christ of Latter-day Saints by geographic region
 Temple architecture (Latter-day Saints)

References

External links 
 Church Newsroom of The Church of Jesus Christ of Latter-day Saints
 Feather River California Temple at ChurchofJesusChristTemples.org

Temples (LDS Church) in California
Proposed religious buildings and structures of the Church of Jesus Christ of Latter-day Saints
Proposed buildings and structures in California
21st-century Latter Day Saint temples
Buildings and structures under construction in the United States